Poncri Auxiliary Aerodrome is a former airport in Panama.

During World War II the airfield was used by the United States Army Air Forces Sixth Air Force as an auxiliary of Howard Field as part of the defense of the Panama Canal.  Known as Pocri Airfield, the XXVI Fighter Command 28th Fighter Squadron flew P-39 Airacobras from the airfield from 22 February – 2 August 1944.

The airfield has been overbuilt with housing.

References

 Maurer, Maurer (1983). Air Force Combat Units Of World War II. Maxwell AFB, Alabama: Office of Air Force History. .

External links

Airfields of the United States Army Air Forces in Panama